Santovka is a village and municipality in the Levice District in the Nitra Region of Slovakia.

History
In historical records the village was first mentioned in 1276.

Geography
The village lies at an altitude of 162 metres and covers an area of 17.866 km². It has a population of about 840 people.

Ethnicity
The village is approximately 88% Slovak, 10% Magyar, 1% Gypsy and 1% Czech

Facilities
The village has a public library a swimming pool a gym and football pitch. It also has a pharmacy and doctor's surgery and numerous general stores and supermarkets

External links
http://www.statistics.sk/mosmis/eng/run.html

Villages and municipalities in Levice District